The Matatiele Local Municipality council consists of fifty-four members elected by mixed-member proportional representation. Twenty-seven councillors are elected by first-past-the-post voting in twenty-seven wards, while the remaining twenty-seven are chosen from party lists so that the total number of party representatives is proportional to the number of votes received. In the election of 1 November 2021 the African National Congress (ANC) won a majority of forty seats.

In 2006 and 2011, the largest opposition party was the locally founded African Independent Congress, protesting against the inclusion of Matatiele in the Eastern Cape rather than KwaZulu-Natal.

Results 
The following table shows the composition of the council after past elections.

March 2006 election

The following table shows the results of the 2006 election.

May 2011 election

The following table shows the results of the 2011 election.

August 2016 election

The following table shows the results of the 2016 election.

November 2021 election

The following table shows the results of the 2021 election.

References

Matatiele
Elections in the Eastern Cape
Alfred Nzo District Municipality